Theatre studies (sometimes referred to as theatrology or dramatics) is the study of theatrical performance in relation to its literary, physical, psychological, sociological, and historical contexts. It is an interdisciplinary field which also encompasses the study of theatrical aesthetics and semiotics. A late-20th-century development in the area has been the ethnographic theory of theatre, pioneered by the Russian scholar Larisa Ivleva who studied the influence of folk culture on the development of Russian theatre.

List of theatrologists

Because of the interdisciplinary nature of the field, those who have been described as theatrologists can vary widely in terms of the primary focus of their activities.
Emil František Burianwriter, singer, actor, musician, composer, playwright and director
Jovan Ćirilovphilosopher, dramaturge, and writer
François Delsarteteacher of acting and singing
Joseph Gregortheatre historian and opera librettist
John Heilperntheatre critic and essayist
Antoine Vitezactor, director, and poet

See also

Dramatic theory
Literary theory
Theatre criticism
Theatre practitioner
Theatre semiotics

References

External links
Library research guides
 
 

 
Theatrical occupations